is a former Japanese football player.

Playing career
Eiji Tomii played for SC Sagamihara, Grulla Morioka and Fujieda MYFC from 2010 to 2015.

References

External links

1987 births
Living people
Hosei University alumni
Association football people from Miyazaki Prefecture
Japanese footballers
J3 League players
SC Sagamihara players
Iwate Grulla Morioka players
Fujieda MYFC players
Association football midfielders